Marius Hofmeyr Hurter (born 8 October 1970), is a former South African rugby union player who played for South Africa between 1995 and 1997. He was a member of the Springbok Squad that won the 1995 Rugby World Cup.

Career

Provincial and club

At the end of the 1998 South African season, Hurter moved to the United Kingdom and joined the Newcastle Falcons and played for the club from 1998 to 2004, winning the Anglo-Welsh Cup in 2001 and 2004.

International
He played his first game for the Springboks on 30 May 1995 against Romania during the 1995 Rugby World Cup. Hurter played in a total of thirteen test - and five tour matches, scoring one try in a tour match, for the Springboks.

Test history

Accolades
In 2003 he was inducted into the University of Pretoria Hall of fame.

See also
List of South Africa national rugby union players – Springbok no. 627

References

External links
Springboks 1995
scrum.com statistics

South African rugby union players
South Africa international rugby union players
Rugby union props
1970 births
Living people
University of Pretoria alumni
Newcastle Falcons players
Lions (United Rugby Championship) players
Bulls (rugby union) players
Blue Bulls players
Rugby union players from Potchefstroom